Chardavol County is in Ilam province, Iran. The capital of the county is the city of Sarableh. At the 2006 census, the county's population was 73,422 in 15,087 households. The following census in 2011 counted 72,167 people in 17,764 households. The county was called Shirvan and Chardavol until 30 June 2013. At the 2016 census, the county's population was 57,381 in 15,867 households, by which time Shirvan District had been separated from the county to form Sirvan County. Holeylan District was separated from the county to become Holeylan County in 2020.

Administrative divisions

The population history and structural changes of Chardavol County's administrative divisions over three consecutive censuses are shown in the following table. The latest census shows four districts, seven rural districts, and five cities.

References

 

Counties of Ilam Province